Bergvliet High School is a public high school in the suburb of Bergvliet in Cape Town, Western Cape, South Africa.

Background
Bergvliet High currently has a student body of approximately 1130 learners. On the 20th of August 2009, it was announced that Stephen Price had been selected to become the new principal of the school. BHS has 2 deputy principals. The school motto is Sapiens Dominabitur Astris.

History
The school was founded in 1957 soon after the relatively new suburb of Bergvliet was built. The first grade eight class was enrolled in 1957, with the first class starting on January 29 of that year. Approximately 70 students attended the first day. The first school principal was Mr. P.A.M van der Spuy, who served from the founding of the school until his retirement in 1969.

See also
BHS - The first 50 Years: Anecdotes, Tributes and Memories - Richard Hamburger

External links
Bergvliet High School website

References 

Schools in Cape Town
Educational institutions established in 1957
1957 establishments in South Africa
High schools in South Africa
Meadowridge